Dr. Clyde Allen Hutchison Jr. (May 5, 1913 – August 29, 2005) was an American chemist notable for his research in magnetic resonance spectroscopy.

Hutchison was a member of the National Academy of Sciences and 
a chairman and professor of the department of chemistry at the University of Chicago.
He was also a fellow of the American Academy of Arts and Sciences,
a fellow of the American Physical Society,
a member of the American Chemical Society, 
Guggenheim fellow at Oxford University,
the George Eastman Professor at Oxford University,
and a member of the American Association for the Advancement of Science.
He was also a recipient of the Peter Debye Award in Physical Chemistry from the American Chemical Society. He served as editor of the Journal of Chemical Physics from 1953 - 1955 and again from 1958 - 1959.
Hutchison participated in the Manhattan Project.
The University of Chicago said that Hutchison "pioneered research in magnetic resonance spectroscopy".

Chronology 
 1913: born May 5 in Alliance, Ohio.
 1933: a bachelor's degree from Cedarville College
 1937: Ph.D. from Ohio State University
 1937–1939: a National Research Council Fellow and worked with Nobel laureate Harold Urey at Columbia University
 1939: an assistant professor of chemistry at the University of Buffalo
 1940–1945: member of the Manhattan Project at Columbia University and the University of Virginia
 1945–1983: member of the faculty of the University of Chicago's Department of Chemistry
 chairman of the department of chemistry 1959-1963
 elected to the National Academy of Sciences in 1963
 1983: retirement
 2005: died of prostate cancer on Aug. 29 at Montgomery Place Retirement Community in Chicago at age 92

References 

1913 births
2005 deaths
20th-century American chemists
Columbia University faculty
University of Chicago faculty
Members of the United States National Academy of Sciences
People from Alliance, Ohio
The Journal of Chemical Physics editors